Miramichi—Grand Lake is a federal electoral district in New Brunswick.

Miramichi—Grand Lake was created by the 2012 federal electoral boundaries redistribution and has been legally defined in the 2013 representation order. It came into effect upon the call of the 42nd Canadian federal election, scheduled for 19 October 2015. The riding succeeded the Miramichi riding (83%), and incorporated small portions of Fredericton (10%), Beauséjour (6%), and Tobique—Mactaquac (1%).

History
Northumberland (later known as Northumberland-Miramichi) was a federal electoral district in New Brunswick, Canada, that was represented in the Canadian House of Commons from 1867 to 1988. It was replaced by Miramichi riding, which was represented in the House of Commons from 1988 to 2015. 

The Miramichi riding consisted of the entirety of Northumberland County and the area around Kouchibouguac National Park, adding in 2003 the Belledune area of Restigouche County and Gloucester County as well several bedroom communities for Bathurst. The bedroom communities of Bathurst were returned to the Acadie-Bathurst riding after the 2006 election.

The Miramichi riding was subsequently succeeded by the current Miramichi-Grand Lake riding, which lost the Belledune region and gained a portion of the Grand Lake region. Unlike Belledune, Grand Lake's name was added to the name of the riding in this redistribution. Miramichi-Grand Lake has been represented in the House of Commons since 2015.

Northumberland/Northumberland—Miramichi

The riding was created in 1867 as "Northumberland" riding, but in 1914 the same name was given to a riding in Ontario. In 1955 this inconvenience was relieved by renaming the New Brunswick riding to "Northumberland—Miramichi".
Until 1966, Northumberland—Miramichi consisted solely of Northumberland County, but due to declining populations, parts of northern Kent County, near present-day Kouchibouguac National Park, were added. In 1987, Northumberland—Miramichi was abolished when it was redistributed into Miramichi and Beauséjour ridings.

Miramichi

Miramichi riding was created in 1987 primarily from Northumberland—Miramichi riding, and incorporating parts of Acadie—Bathurst, Madawaska—Restigouche and York—Sunbury ridings.

Between 1987 and 1996, Miramichi also included a small part of York County, and in 2003, a large area to the north, including Allardville and Belledune, was added to the riding.

In 2004, there were legal problems regarding the 2003 boundaries. The following is from the Elections Canada website:

In May 2004, the Federal Court of Canada made its decision in Raîche v. Canada (Attorney General), concerning a portion of the electoral boundary between the ridings of Miramichi and Acadie—Bathurst. The Court held that in transferring certain parts of parishes from the riding of Acadie–Bathurst to Miramichi, the Federal Electoral Boundaries Commission for New Brunswick erred in its application of the rules governing the preparation of its recommendations. The new boundaries commission was created under Part I of the Inquiries Act in response to this court decision.

The boundaries reverted to the ones used in the 1996 representation after the 2006 election.

Miramichi-Grand Lake
The Miramichi riding was subsequently succeeded by the current Miramichi-Grand Lake riding, which gained a portion of the Grand Lake region. Unlike adjoining regions which had been added to the riding in previous redistributions, Grand Lake's name was added to the name of the riding in this redistribution. Miramichi-Grand Lake has been represented in the House of Commons since 2015.

Members of Parliament

Election results

Miramichi—Grand Lake, 2013 – present

Miramichi, 1987–2013

Northumberland—Miramichi, 1955–1987

Northumberland, 1867–1955

References

 Campaign expense data from Elections Canada
Map of Miramichi riding archived by Elections Canada
Riding history from the Library of Parliament:
Northhumberland
Northhumberland-Miramichi
Miramichi

Notes

New Brunswick federal electoral districts
Politics of Miramichi, New Brunswick